The Gila APC is a mine protected vehicle from South Africa developed by private investors and manufactured by IVEMA and similar to the more popular Casspir.

This four-wheeled vehicle is used for troop transport. It can hold a crew of two, plus 9 passengers.

Operators
: UN Forces in Darfur
: 6 supplied by Canada for Military Police of Burkina Faso

Variants

 Gila APC
 Gila Armoured Ambulance
 Missile Carrier
 mortar carrier
 electronic warfare vehicle
 battlefield re-supply vehicle
 command post vehicle

See also
Buffalo (mine protected vehicle), a 6x6 originally built by Force Protection Inc
Cougar (vehicle), a 4x4 originally built by Force Protection Inc
Buffel, an early South African mine protected vehicle
Oshkosh M-ATV, current generation lighter weight mine protected vehicle manufactured by Oshkosh Corporation
Mahindra Mine Protected Vehicle, design inspired by the Casspir
Casspir

References

External links

Armoured personnel carriers of South Africa